Zoran Babović (born 1 March 1954) is a retired Serbian football striker and later manager.

References

1954 births
Living people
Serbian footballers
FK Zemun players
Kastoria F.C. players
Pierikos F.C. players
Serbian expatriate footballers
Expatriate footballers in Greece
Expatriate football managers in Greece
Serbian expatriate sportspeople in Greece
Serbian football managers
Trikala F.C. managers
Athlitiki Enosi Larissa F.C. managers
Panetolikos F.C. managers
Kallithea F.C. managers
Ethnikos Piraeus F.C. managers
PAS Lamia 1964 managers
Anagennisi Karditsa F.C. managers
Association football forwards